Quine may refer to:
 Quine (surname), people with the surname Quine
 Willard Van Orman Quine, the philosopher, or things named after him:
 Quine (computing), a program that produces its source code as output
 Quine–McCluskey algorithm, an algorithm used for logic minimization
 Quine's paradox, in logic
 Duhem–Quine thesis, in philosophy of science
 Quine–Putnam indispensability argument, in philosophy of mathematics